The Central Economic Intelligence Bureau (CEIB) is an Indian intelligence agency responsible for gathering information and monitoring the economic and financial sectors for economic offences and warfare.

Formation
The Central Economic Intelligence Bureau was established in July 1985 responsible to the Department of Revenue, Ministry of Finance. Along with the Income Tax Department it is India's chief agency responsible for economic intelligence, monitoring and fighting economic offences such as smuggling, money laundering, tax evasion and fraud.

Organisation
The Central Economic Intelligence Bureau is headed by a Director General, who also carries the designation of Special Secretary to the Government of India. The CEIB is the chief constituent of the Economic Intelligence Council and is responsible to the Finance Minister of India. The sanctioned strength of the Bureau includes two Deputy Directors General and Joint Secretaries, the Joint Secretary (COFEPOSA), five Assistant Directors General, four Under Secretaries and eight Senior Technical Officers. Including intelligence officers and secretarial staff, the total strength of the bureau stands at 133.

Functions
 To collect information on various illegal economic activities and monitor sensitive and susceptible sectors of the Indian economy and financial sector. 
 To ensure the full implementation of the Conservation of Foreign Exchange and Prevention of Smuggling Activities Act, 1974 (COFEPOSA). It is also responsible for developing methods to counter such crimes and criminal organisations involved. 
 It is the chief coordinator of other agencies in the Ministry of Finance that are responsible for fighting economic offences, as well as the agencies of state governments. 
 It also cooperates and liaisons with the Central Bureau of Investigation (CBI), Central Board of Excise and Customs (CBEC), Directorate of Revenue Intelligence (DRI), Central Board of Direct Taxes (CBDT), etc. 
 The CEIB also cooperates at the international level with the agencies of other countries responsible for customs, drugs and economic law enforcement.

See also

References

Indian intelligence agencies
Ministry of Finance (India)
Financial regulation in India
Financial crime prevention
Tax evasion in India
1985 establishments in India
Government agencies established in 1985